Alpha II-spectrin, also known as Spectrin alpha chain, brain is a protein that in humans is encoded by the SPTAN1 gene. Alpha II-spectrin is expressed in a variety of tissues, and is highly expressed in cardiac muscle at Z-disc structures, costameres and at the sarcolemma membrane. Mutations in alpha II-spectrin have been associated with early infantile epileptic encephalopathy-5, and alpha II-spectrin may be a valuable biomarker for Guillain–Barré syndrome and infantile congenital heart disease.

Structure
Alternate splicing of alpha II-spectrin has been documented and results in multiple transcript variants; specifically, cardiomyocytes have four identified alpha II-spectrin splice variants. As opposed to alpha I-spectrin that is principally found in erythrocytes, alpha II-spectrin is expressed in most tissues. In cardiac tissue, alpha II-spectrin is found in myocytes at Z-discs, costameres, and the sarcolemma membrane, and in cardiac fibroblasts along the surface of the cytoskeletal network. Alpha II-spectrin most commonly exists in a heterodimer with alpha II and beta II spectrin subunits; and dimers typically self-associate and heterotetramerize.

Function 
The spectrins are a family of widely distributed cytoskeletal proteins which are involved in actin crosslinking, cell adhesion, intercellular communication and cell cycle regulation. Though a role in cardiac muscle is not well understood, it is likely that alpha II-spectrin is involved in organizing sub-sarcolemmal domains and stabilizing sarcolemmal membranes against the stresses associated with continuous cardiac contraction. Functional diversity of alpha II-spectrin is manifest through its four splice variants. First, a cardiac-specific, 21 amino acid sequence insert in the 21st spectrin repeat, termed alpha II-cardi+, was identified as an insert that modulates affinity of alpha II-spectrin for binding beta-spectrins and regulates myocyte growth and differentiation. Secondly, another insert of 20 amino acids in the 10th spectrin repeat, termed SH3i+, contains protein kinase A and protein kinase C phosphorylation sites and modulates Ca2+-dependent cleavage of spectrin and protein-protein interaction properties. Thirdly, an insert of five amino acids in the fifteenth spectrin motif bears a highly antigenic epitope resembling an ankyrin-like p53 binding protein binding site. Fourthly, a six amino acid insert in the twenty-first spectrin motif with unknown function has been reported.

Alpha II-spectrin gene expression has been shown to be upregulated in cardiac fibroblasts in response to Angiotensin II-induced cardiac remodeling.

In animal models of disease and injury, alpha II-spectrin has been implicated in diverse functions. In a canine model of hypothermic circulatory arrest, alpha II-spectrin breakdown products have shown to be relevant markers of neurologic injury post-cardiac surgery.

Clinical significance
Mutations in SPTAN1 are the cause of early infantile epileptic encephalopathy-5.

Alpha II-spectrin has shown promising utility as a biomarker for brain necrosis and apoptosis in infants with congenital heart disease; breakdown products of alpha II-spectrin have been detected in the serum of neonates in the perioperative period and following open-heart surgery. Elevated protein expression of alpha II-spectrin has been detected in cerebrospinal fluid in patients with Guillain–Barré syndrome.

Interactions 

SPTAN1 has been shown to interact with:
 Abl gene,
 FANCA, 
 Fanconi anemia, complementation group C, 
 GRIA2, 
 Plectin, 
 SHANK1,  and
 Vimentin.

See also 
 Sjögren's syndrome

References

Further reading 

 
 
 
 
 
 
 
 
 
 
 
 
 
 
 
 
 
 
 

EF-hand-containing proteins